The Fender Precision Bass Lyte is a fretted model of electric bass manufactured by Fender Musical Instruments Corporation. This bass is characterized by its smaller modern C shape body, P-J pickup configuration, and light weight. The Precision Bass Lyte is equipped with 22 medium jumbo frets and has a scale length of 34 inches. Another relatively unique feature to the Lyte is the Pickup Pan knob which allows users to modulate the amount of the two pickups used. The Lyte is an offshoot of the Fender Precision Bass.

Only ever produced in Japan, the Lyte came to be from the Fender Japan Deal that saw a joint venture between Fender, Kanda Shokai and Yamano Gakki. In 1982, production of Fender products in Japan began, and two years later the first Fender Precision Lyte model was made.

"Made in Japan" and "Crafted in Japan"
Every Fender guitar that came out before 1993 was inscribed with "Made in Japan". That changed in 1992 when some production switched to Dyna Gakki due to FujiGen Gakki switching focus to its own production. Thus some guitars after 1992 were inscribed with "Crafted in Japan" due to a contract stipulation dating back to the original deal. From 1996 onward however, "Crafted in Japan" was used exclusivlely until 2015, when Fender took over the entire operation and the original deal ended. Guitars made in Japan by Fender are now placed under the umbrella of the "Made in Japan" series and now have the mark on the bottom of the neck.

Design and weight
The Lyte comes in 6 different colors and finishes. Basswood is used for the body, and maple is used for the neck, although this varies depending on the year of production and place. From 1982 to 1996, some necks for Fender Japan Guitars were made by Atlansia. The fittings are die-cast gold, and the pickups are covered by a plastic sheath. The access panel for the electronics in the Lyte is located at the back of the bass, secured with 4 screws. There are four different control knobs on the Lyte, consisting of a Master Volume, Pan, Bass Boost/Cut and Treble Boost/Cut.

The weight of a Precision Bass fluctuates between models, but stays between 8.5 and 9.5 pounds. The Lyte, however, weighs only about 7 pounds due to smaller body, active pickups, and weight stripping at the neck and head due to the use of Gotoh "Mini" tuners.

Replacement models
Following the discontinuation of the Lyte in Japan, and the foray into the Mexican Market, Fender chose to make a bass similar to the Lyte. In 2001, the Fender Zone Bass was first made in Mexico, to replace not only the Lyte, but also the Fender Precision Bass Lyte Deluxe and was very similar with the exception of a new pickup design and a voltage powered 3-band EQ preamp. In 2006, both the American Zone and the Mexican Zone were discontinued.

See also
 Fender Telecaster Bass
 Fender Precision Bass
 Fender Zone Bass

References

Precision
Musical instruments invented in the 1980s